The mass media in Cameroon includes independent outlets. The nation has only one national newspaper, which is state owned.

Cameroon's media includes print publications that are both public and privately owned; a public television station and privately owned channels; radio stations that are public, privately owned, and foreign; and the Internet.

Print media

History 
In the early's 1900s, European religious missions released the first newspapers in what is now Cameroon, including Mulee-Ngea in 1903 (by the Evangelical missionaries in Buea), Mwendi wa Musango in 1906 (by the Baptists in Douala) and Elolombe Ya Kamerun in 1908 (by the Protestant missionaries). 
They were written primarily in native languages and their main purpose was to teach norms and values of the "new civilization". Opposition press appeared during the French Colonial period, in the 1920s, written by Cameroonians criticizing European colonization. Some of them were written and printed outside of Cameroon, such as Mbale ("The Truth"), which was produced in France. Due to their critics of French colonization, Mbale was shut down after three issues in 1929. From 1945 to 1959, nationalist spirit and press freedom in Cameroon allowed the emergence of political newspapers, most of them attached to a political party. Most writers in this period weren't journalists and influencing public opinion was the main goal.

After independence, the opposition press lost influence and pro-government and neutral media appeared, such as Le Press du Cameroun. In June 1962, several journalists were arrested in a policy known as the "law of silence". However, no legal changes were implemented until 1966, when the law of liberty of the press was changed requiring editors to give copies of their final proofs to the office of the Minister of Territorial Administration (MINAT) and the local prefect four hours before publication or distribution. MINAT was allowed to censor each issue. After the change in the law, the number of newspapers was reduced from 30 to 9 in the following five years.

The 1970s were the low point of Cameroon journalism. Most newspapers avoided political topics and were focused on sports. No new publications appeared until 1974, when the government created the Societé de Presse et d'Editions du Cameroun (SOPECAM), and released Cameroon Tribune. In 1982, Paul Biya replaced Ahamadou Ahidjo as President of Cameroon. The transition period renewed interest in political issues due to Biya's democratization program "Le Renouveau" (New Deal), and new independent newspapers surged. However, the press law of 1966 remained until December 1990. A new law concerning the print media reaffirmed press freedom but maintained some restrictions. After this reform, editors were not required to get authorization before the publication of newspapers. Censors decisions could be appealed to a judge.

Current print media 
Cameroon's print media includes several publications, including the following:

Public 

 Journal officiel de la République du Cameroun: announces the publication of laws
 Cameroon Tribune: official national daily, published bilingually in French and English

Privately owned 

 Cameroon Weekly: weekly best selling private newspaper
 Le Messager
 Mutations
 La Nouvelle Expression: includes an online edition
 The Herald: English, includes an online edition
 The Post: English, includes an online edition
 Le Popoli: humour newspaper
 La Voix du paysan
 La Nouvelle Tribune: weekly, economic and financial news
 Le Jour
 Dikalo
 Eden Newspaper
 Guardian Post
 The Star Newspaper
 The Sun Newspaper
 The Rambler Newspaper

Radio and television

Television 
Television first came to Cameroon in 1985 (relatively late, if compared to other African countries). It arrived as part of the development and modernization project of the President Paul Biya, who saw it as a mean of education for the youths, as he stated in his political manifesto Pour le libéralisme communautaire (1987). For the construction of the television centre at Mballa II and the training centre at Ekounou in Yaounde were invested ninety billion francs CFA and antennas and repeater stations were built in different strategic sites to assure decent coverage by television signals all around the country. The first broadcast was in 1985, in Bamenda, in occasion of the congress of the single party, in which the Cameroonian National Union became the Cameroon People’s Democratic Party. Until the end of the 1990s there was only one official television channel, which was the state-owned CRTV. While Paul Biya and its entourage presented television as a mean of development, many others saw it as a propaganda tool in the hand of the regime to tendentiously inform the population, praise the government, and denigrate its opponents.

Beyond news and political event coverage, in the 1980s and 1990s, CRTV produced good quality TV series with the aim to entertain and educate the Cameroonian public, against a perceived moral decadence.  The most famous productions among the viewers were L'orphelin (1988–1989, dir. Ndamba Eboa) and Le débrouillard (1989–1990, dir. Ndamba Eboa), the misadventure of an orphan who suffers victimization by his stepmother, La succession de Wabo Defo (1986, dir. Daouda Mouchangou), a semi-documentary telefilm on the funeral and successor ceremonies in a bamileke chiefdom, Kabiyene ou à qui la faute? (1987, dir. Ndamba Eboa), the story of a village girl who is beaten hard by the city life, and L'étoile de Noudi (1989, dir. Daouda Mouchangou), the story of a young girl who escapes from an arranged marriage with an old village chief and becomes a prostitute in the city.  In addition to these successful telefilms, CRTV produced many other low quality TV series, which remained almost unnoticed among the public, docu-fictions with a declared didactic purpose, in collaboration with the Catholic church and NGOs, and adaptations of theatrical performances.  The rest of the airtime was dedicated to European sport, South-American telenovelas, Hollywood and French films downloaded from TV5 Monde, Canal France International, and Canal Plus.  Most of these programs were in French, although Cameroon is a bilingual country, with both English and French as official languages.

In addition to CRTV, other private TV channels were broadcasting illegally, before the media liberalization. The best known was TV Max, finally forced to close down after a legal queerly with CRTV, at the beginning of the 2000s. In December 1990 the law n° 90/052 on social communication authorized the opening of private media, but private radio and television broadcasting was allowed only in April 2000, following the decree n° 2000/158. The liberalization of the audio-visual sector led to the mushrooming of private television stations in the main cities of the country, which tried to beat the competition of state television with programs more attuned to the interests and needs of the population. The local viewers welcomed this change and new television stations, such as Canal 2 International, Equinoxe television, and STV, have quickly become the most appreciated by the public.

Even in the new liberalized media environment, government maintains tight control over television, by the institutionalization of a broadcasting license for audiovisual exploitation. According to the article 15 of the April 2000 decree, commercial television stations must pay 100 million francs CFA ($192,000) to get a ten-year license by the Minister of Communication. Considering that the amount is huge when compared to the economic level of the country, the authorities created the so-called principle of “administrative tolerance”, which enabled media entrepreneurs to run their television stations before being fully licensed. Being this a discretional principle, media operators work under threat, as it is sufficient to make a reportage that the authorities do not like to be shut down for illegal exercise of the profession. A case in point is Equinoxe television, banned for several months in 2008, after taking position against the change of the constitution promoted by President Paul Biya.

It is estimated that CRTV covers 60% of the country through 64 transmitters. Since 2001 it has also offered satellite transmission. Private TV stations have their own transmitters. Both STV and Canal 2 International are received in the Southern half of Cameroon and are available over satellite and cable bouquets elsewhere. The only Cameroonian cable distribution enterprise is TV+, owned by Emmanuel Chatue, who also runs the television station Canal 2 International. TV+ sells images which are broadcast by foreign television channels to Cameroonian consumers, especially western movies and soap-operas.  However, there are many other abusive small cable distributors who illegally distribute foreign images for very cheap fees.  In addition, many of them run abusive TV channels that broadcast global media products acquired mainly through illegal internet download.

Public 
 CRTV Télé: maintains a website

Privately owned 

 STV1  (spectrum TV 1)
 STV 2 (Spectrum TV 2)
 Canal 2 International
 Ariane TV
 Equinox TV
 TV Max
 Kopra TV, channel under development
 DBS, channel under development
 Vision 4, in the testing phase
 New TV, under development
 Africa TV, under development
 L.T.M TV Douala
 canal2 zebra
 SAMBA TV
 T.L under development
 CAMNEWS24 Douala
 Liberty TV (Douala)
 KCBS Television (Kumba)
 cam 1 tv (limbe)

PSTV  (PEFSCOM TELEVISION) (buea)
HiTv(Buea)
 RTV Evangelium Archdiocese of Bamenda

Radio

Public 
Cameroon has several public radio stations, regulated by the Radio de l'office national de radio et télévision (CRTV).
 The national station, transmitting from Yaoundé
 Ten provincial radio stations

Privately owned 

 Radio Jeunesse, Yaoundé
 RTS (Radio Tiemeni Siantou), has a website, Yaoundé and Bafang
 Magic FM, Yaoundé
 TBC, Yaoundé
 FM 94 Yaoundé
 Radio Venus, Yaoundé
 Radio Environnement, Yaoundé
 Radio Lumière, Yaoundé
 Sky One Radio, Yaoundé
 Radio Bonne Nouvelle, Yaoundé
 Moov Radio, Yaoundé
 Radio Equinoxe, has a website, Douala
 Sweet FM, Douala
 FM Suellaba (known mainly be the name FM 105), Douala
 Radio Nostalgie, Douala
 RTM (Real Time Radio), Douala
 Radio Veritas, Douala
 FM Medumba, Bangangté
 Radio Yemba, Dschang
 Radio Star FM, Bafoussam
 Radio Batcham, Bafoussam
 Radio Salaaman, Garoua
 FM Mont Cameroun Buea
 CBS Radio, Buea
 MediaAfrique Radio, Buea
 Dream FM, Buea
 Revival Gospel Radio, Buea
 Radio Bonakanda, Buea
 Radio Fotouni, Fotouni
 FM Pouala Bafoussam
 Eden Radio FM (Limbe)
 Ocean City Radio (Limbe)
 Eternity Gospel Radio (Limbe)
 Radio Oku, Oku
 Radio Lolodorf, Lolodorf
 Satellite FM, Yaoundé
 Radio Equatoriale, Sangmélimad
 Radio Casmando, Douala
 Hit Radio, Douala
 Stone FM Radio (Ndop)
 Lakesite Radio (Kumba)
 Calvary Good News (Radio Kumba)
 Ocean City Radio (Radio Kumba)
 Radio Hotcocoa (Bamenda)
 Abakwa FM Radio (Bamenda)
 NDEFCAM Radio (Bamenda)
 CBC Radio (Bamenda)
 Chamba Community Radio (Balikumbat) FM 103.0 MHz

City FM (Bamenda)
Skysports Radio (Bamenda)
DMCR (Nkambe)
Sky FM (Ndu)
Savanna Radio (Ndu)
 Radio Evangelium, Archdiocese of Bamenda
 Radio Evangelium Diocese of Kumbo
 Radio Evangelium Diocese of Kumba
 Radio Evangelium Diocese of Mamfe
 Divine Mercy Radio, Diocese of Buea
Renaissance Community Radio (Ndu)
Community Radio (Kumbo)
 SANTA COMMUNITY RADIO (95.3 FM)

International 

 BBC World Service: English, with some broadcasts in French
 RFI : French, with some broadcasts in English and Spanish

It is also possible to receive Canal+ Horizons.

Telecommunications
Cameroon's telecommunications network is still inadequate by international standards; the fixed line infrastructure, owned by the monopoly fixed-line service provider Camtel, has outdated equipment and service in the country is irregular. Only 1 out of every 100 Cameroonians has a fixed-line telephone.

As of 2018, 76% of the population (19.1 million people) had mobile phone subscriptions.

Internet
In 2018, Cameroon reportedly had 6.13 million internet users (25% penetration). The majority of these, 5.79 million, access the internet through their mobile phones. Social media penetration was reportedly at 14% in 2018 (3.6 million people). Men and women appear to use the internet equally.

See also
 Freedom of Speech in Cameroon
Communications in Cameroon
 Internet censorship and surveillance in Cameroon
 Cinema of Cameroon
 Literature of Cameroon

References

Bibliography
 
  
  
 
 
 
 

 
Cameroon
Cameroon